Hadena drenowskii is a species of moth of the  family Noctuidae. It is found in the Balkans, Ukraine, Turkey, Armenia, Israel, the Caucasus region, Iran and Turkmenistan.

Adults are on wing from June to August. There is one generation per year.

The larvae probably feed on capsules of Caryophyllaceae species.

Subspecies
Hadena drenowskii drenowskii
Hadena drenowskii sultana
Hadena drenowskii kendevani (northern Iran)
Hadena drenowskii khorassana (Iran)
Hadena drenowskii lapidea

External links
 Hadeninae of Israel

Hadena
Moths of Europe
Moths of Asia